Marina, distinguished as Marina the Monk and also known as Marinos, Pelagia and Mary of Alexandria, was a Christian saint from part of Asian Byzantium, generally said to be Lebanon. Details of the saint's life vary.

Marina probably lived in the 5th century, and the first biographical account was probably written sometime between 525 and 650; it is preserved in several manuscripts, including one from the tenth century.

Legend
Marina (in some Western traditions, or Mary or Mariam in other manuscript traditions) was the child of wealthy Christian parents. Her mother died when Marina was very young, so Marina was raised as a devout Christian by her father Eugenius. As Marina approached marriageable age, her father intended to find his child a husband and then retire to the Monastery of Qannoubine in the Kadisha Valley of Lebanon. When Marina learned of his plan, she asked why he intended to save his own soul "and destroy mine." When asked by her father, "What shall I do with you? You are a woman", Marina answered that she would live as a monk with him: she then shaved her head and changed into men's clothes. Eugenius, seeing his child's strong determination, gave all his possessions to the poor and travelled with Marina to the Kadisha Valley to live in monastic community life, where they shared a cell. She took the name Marinos. The other monks attributed her soft voice to long periods of prayer, or else believed their new brother was a male eunuch.

After ten years of prayer, fasting and worship together, Eugenius died. Now alone, Marina became only more intently ascetic and continued to conceal her sex. One day, the abbot of the monastery sent her with three other monks to attend to some business for the monastery. As the journey was long, they were forced to spend the night at an inn. Also lodging there was a soldier of the eastern Roman front. Upon seeing the beauty of the inn keeper's daughter, who was working there, the soldier seduced her and defiled her virginity, instructing her to say, "that the young monk, Father Marina, did that to me" should she conceive a child.

After some time, it was discovered that the inn keeper's daughter was pregnant and, as was agreed, she told her father that "it was the young monk, abba Marina, who did that to me." On hearing the story, the man went furiously to the abbot of the monastery. The abbot calmed the man and told him that he would see to the matter. He called for Marina and reprimanded her severely. When Marina realized what was happening she fell to her knees and wept, confessing her sinfulness and asking forgiveness. Enraged, the abbot told Marina to leave the monastery. She left at once and remained outside the gates as a beggar for several years. When the inn keeper's daughter gave birth, he took the child and gave him to Marina. So Marina raised the child. She fed the child with sheep's milk, provided by the local shepherds, and remained caring for him outside the monastery for ten years. Finally the monks convinced the abbot to allow Marina to return; he accepted but he also imposed heavy penalties upon Marina, who was to perform hard labour in cooking, cleaning and carrying water in addition to regular monastic duties and caring for the child.

At the age of forty, Marina became ill. Three days later she died from the illness. The abbot ordered that Marina's body be cleaned, her clothes changed and that she be transferred to the church for funeral prayers. While fulfilling these tasks, the monks discovered that she was, in fact, a woman. This made them very distressed. The monks informed the abbot, who came to Marina's side and wept bitterly for the wrongs done. The abbot then called for the inn keeper and informed him that Marina was a woman. The inn keeper went to where the body lay and also wept for the pain and suffering which he had unjustly brought upon Marina. During the funeral prayers, one of the monks, who was blind in one eye, is said to have received full sight again after he touched the body. It was also believed that God allowed a devil to torment the inn keeper's daughter and the soldier, and that this caused them to travel to where the saint was buried, where they confessed their iniquity in front of everyone and asked for forgiveness.

Veneration
Marina is venerated in the Catholic Church, the Eastern Orthodox Churches and the Coptic Orthodox Church. Today, Coptic Orthodox Christians say that Marina's body is kept at Saint Mary Church and has not decomposed. It is displayed to the public on Marina's feast day, on Mesra 15. Catholics believe that her relics have been translated to the Venetian church of her name in 1230, and from Venice some of them further to Parisian church of her name. They celebrate Marina's memorial on June 18, and the translation on July 17. 

In 2022, Marina was officially added to the Episcopal Church liturgical calendar with a feast day on 17 June.

Notes

References

External links
The Monastery of Saint Marinos or Srkhouvank
Golden Legend: The Life of Saint Marine
Santiebeati 

5th-century Byzantine monks
Lebanese saints
5th-century Christian saints
Year of birth unknown
Coptic Orthodox saints
Christian female saints of the Middle Ages
5th-century Byzantine women
Legendary Romans
Cross-dressing saints